Elmo Saves Christmas is a Sesame Street musical fantasy comedy television special released on PBS on December 2, 1996. It was released to VHS that same year. Inspired by the 1892 short story "Christmas Every Day" by William Dean Howells, Elmo wishes for Christmas to occur every day, only to be taken to the future to learn the adverse consequences of his wish. The program was filmed in Sesame Street's usual home, the Kaufman Astoria Studios in New York City. Footage from the film It's a Wonderful Life also appears in the program and after the credits.

Plot

The story is told in flashback by Maya Angelou, who recalls the events to Telly, Zoe, Baby Bear and several children.

Elmo stays up on Christmas Eve to meet Santa Claus. He falls asleep, but is awakened by Santa stuck in the chimney. Elmo helps pull out Santa, who gives Elmo the choice of a teddy bear or a magical snow globe. Elmo chooses the globe and is granted three wishes, wasting his first wish on a glass of water.

On Christmas Day, Elmo wishes for Christmas to be every day, but Santa warns him that Christmas would no longer be special. Lightning, a reindeer-in-training, takes Elmo to the future to see the effects of his wish. Big Bird is sad that his friend Snuffy is  visiting his grandmother in Cincinnati, the businesses remain closed, It's a Wonderful Life plays continuously on every TV channel, Santa's overworked elves start making flawed toys, and other holidays are overshadowed. However, only Oscar the Grouch enjoys all the misery.

By next year's Christmas, everyone is tired of celebrating and has run out of gift ideas, the carolers have lost their voices, Christmas trees are an endangered species, all the businesses are bankrupt, and Santa has retired to Florida. Elmo uses his last wish to make Christmas annual again, but his snow globe breaks before the wish is granted. Lightning thus takes him back to the Christmas Eve when he rescued Santa, and Elmo chooses a stuffed "Moo-Bunny" as his new gift. On Christmas morning, Snuffy returns, telling Big Bird that his grandmother came to Sesame Street instead. In the end, Elmo has learned that although Christmas does not occur every day, everyone can keep their Christmas spirit alive all year.

Cast
 Maya Angelou as herself/narrator
 Charles Durning as Santa Claus
 Harvey Fierstein as the Easter Bunny
 14 Karat Soul as Themselves

Humans
 Carlo Alban as Carlo
 Alison Bartlett-O'Reilly as Gina
 Emilio Delgado as Luis
 Desiree Casado as Gabi
 Sonia Manzano as Maria
 Bob McGrath as Bob
 Roscoe Orman as Gordon
 David Smyrl as Mr. Handford

Muppet Performers and Voice Cast
 Frank Oz as Bert, Cookie Monster, and Grover
 Jerry Nelson as Herry Monster, The Amazing Mumford, Count von Count, Mr. Johnson, and News Flash Announcer
 Kevin Clash as Elmo, Baby Natasha, Benny Rabbit, Father, and Elf 3
 Fran Brill as Prairie Dawn, Zoe, and Elf 2
 Joey Mazzarino as Ingrid, Stinky, Lightning, and Elf 1
 Carmen Osbahr as Rosita
 Caroll Spinney as Big Bird and Oscar the Grouch
 Martin P. Robinson as Mr. Snuffleupagus, Telly Monster, and Elf 5
 David Rudman as Baby Bear, Humphrey, and Elf 4
 Bryant Young as Rear End of Mr. Snuffleupagus
 Steve Whitmire as Kermit the Frog, and Ernie
Additional Muppets performed by Peter Linz, Noel MacNeal, Jim Martin, John Tartaglia, Jim Kroupa, Alice Dinnean and Matt Vogel

Songs
 "It's Christmas Again"
 "Every Day Can't Be Christmas"
 "Give Your Friend an Easter Egg for Christmas"
 "All I Want for Christmas is You"
 "Keep Christmas with You (All Through the Year)"

See also
 List of Christmas films

References

External links

 
 Elmo Saves Christmas at Muppet Wiki

1996 television specials
1990s American television specials
Sesame Street features
American Christmas films
Christmas television specials
Santa Claus in film
1990s American animated films
1996 American television series debuts
Santa Claus in television
Puppet films
Easter Bunny in television